Plurality block voting, also known as plurality-at-large voting, block vote or block voting (BV) is a non-proportional voting system for electing representatives in multi-winner elections. Each voter may cast as many votes as the number of seats to be filled. The usual result where the candidates divide into parties is that the most popular party in the district sees its full slate of candidates elected in a seemingly landslide victory.

The term "plurality at-large" is in common usage in elections for representative members of a body who are elected or appointed to represent the whole membership of the body (for example, a city, state or province, nation, club or association). Where the system is used in a territory divided into multi-member electoral districts the system is commonly referred to as "block voting" or the "bloc vote". These systems are usually based on a single round of voting, but can also be used in the runoffs of majority-at-large voting, as in some local elections in France, where candidates who do not receive an absolute majority must compete in a second round.

The party-list version of plurality block voting is party block voting (PBV), also called the general ticket, which also uses a simple plurality election in multi-member districts. In such a system, each party puts forward a slate of candidates, a voter casts just one vote, and the party winning a plurality of votes sees its whole slate elected, winning all the seats.

Casting and counting ballots

Block voting 
In a block voting election, all candidates run against each other for m number of positions, where m is commonly called the district magnitude. Each voter selects up to m candidates on the ballot (voters have m votes, and are able to cast no more than one per candidate (they are unable to vote for the same candidate more than once as is permitted in cumulative voting)).

Voters are permitted to cast their votes across candidates of different parties (ticket splitting).

The m candidates with the most votes (who may or may not obtain a majority of available votes or support from the majority of the voters) are declared elected and will fill the positions.

Due to multiple voting, when a party runs more than one candidate, it is impossible to know if the party had support of as many voters as the party tally of votes (up to number of voters participating in the election) or if it had support of just the number of voters equivalent to the votes received by the most popular candidate and the other candidates of that party merely received votes from subset of that group.

Example 
Candidates are running in a three-member district; each of the 10,000 voters may cast three votes (but do not have to). Voters may not cast more than one vote for a single candidate.

Party A has about 35% support among the electorate, Party B around 25% and the remaining voters primarily support independent candidates.

Candidates of Party A won in a landslide, even though they only received a plurality (35–37%) among the voters (10,000). This is because most parties run as many candidates as there are open seats and voters of a party usually do not split their ticket, but vote for all candidates of that party.

By contrast, a single transferable vote system would likely elect 1 candidate from party A, 1 candidate from party B and 1 independent candidate in this scenario.

Effects of block voting 
The block voting system has a number of features which can make it unrepresentative of the voters' intentions. Block voting regularly produces complete landslide majorities for the group of candidates with the highest level of support. Additionally, like first past the post methods, if there are many parties running and voters do not engage in tactical voting, a small cohesive group of voters, making up only a minority of the voters, can elect all the open seats by merely constituting a plurality.

Landslide victories 
Under block voting, a slate of clones of the top-place candidate may win every available seat. A voter does have the option to vote for candidates of different political parties if they wish, but if the largest group of voters have strong party loyalty, there is nothing the other voters or parties can do to prevent a landslide.

While many criticize block voting's tendency to create landslide victories, some cite it as a strength. Since the winners of a block voting election generally represent the same slate or group of voters, there is greater agreement amongst those elected, potentially leading to a reduction in political gridlock.

Tactical voting and strategic nomination 
Plurality block voting, like single-winner plurality voting, is particularly vulnerable to tactical voting. Supporters of relatively unpopular third parties have a substantial incentive to avoid wasted votes by casting all of their votes for a slate of candidates from a major party.

Parties in block voting systems can also benefit from strategic nomination. Coalitions are actively hurt when they have more candidates than there are seats to fill, as vote-splitting will occur. Similarly, a coalition has a substantial incentive to nominate a full slate of candidates, as otherwise supporting voters may cast some of their remaining votes for opposing candidates.

Bullet voting is a strategy in which a voter only votes for a single candidate in an attempt to stop them being beaten by additional choices. Because the voter is essentially wasting a portion of their vote, bullet voting is only a good strategy when the voter has a strong preference for their favourite and is unsure of, and/or indifferent to, the other candidates' relative chances of winning, for example, if the voter supports an independent candidate or a minor party which has only nominated one candidate.

This system sometimes fosters the creation of an electoral alliance between political parties or groups as opposed to a coalition. This has been the case in the National Assembly of Mauritius; the New Hampshire House of Representatives, with the election of multiple Free State Project as well as New Hampshire Liberty Alliance members; and in the Vermont Senate, with the elections of Vermont Progressive Party members Tim Ashe and Anthony Pollina. Historically, similar situations arose within the multi-member constituencies in the Parliament of the United Kingdom.

Vacancies 
When compared with other voting methods, the question of how to fill vacancies that occur under Block Voting can be difficult given the way that by-elections to fill a single seat in a multi-member district can be expensive. 

There are alternative ways of selecting a replacement.

One way is to fill any seat that becomes empty by appointing the most popular unsuccessful candidate in the last election, in a version of countback. This was used in the City of Edmonton (Canada) following the 1905 Edmonton municipal election.

Use of block voting

National elections 

The following countries use plurality block voting (not including party block voting using plurality) in their national electoral systems:

Sub-national elections 
Other countries using block voting:

 Canada, in many local government elections, and in Senate nominee elections in Alberta
 China for the National People's Congress and local people's congresses in provincial, municipal and regional levels with combined approval voting
 Ecuador in 1998 
 Hungary, for local elections in municipalities under 10,000 residents. The system is officially called "individualized list electoral system" or "electoral system using personalized lists", which can be loosely interpreted as meaning personalized block voting, as opposed to party list systems, such as party block voting (general ticket) or party list PR.
 Iran, for the city and village councils
 Lebanon
 Philippines, for Senate and local legislative elections
 Russia, in some local elections, e.g. in Moscow district councils elections
 Singapore, for group representation constituencies (GRCs)
 Syria 
 Tonga, for noble elections
 United Kingdom, in some local elections.
 United States, in some state and local elections.

In France, the election of municipal councilors takes place by majority vote plurinominal, in two rounds with panachage:

 In the first round, candidates are elected if they receive an absolute majority of votes cast and the vote of a quorum of at least a quarter of registered voters;
 In the second round, a simple majority suffices. If multiple candidates receive the same number of votes, the election is won by the older of the candidates when no one can be elected based on the number of seats

Block voting was used in the Australian Senate from 1901 to 1948 (from 1918, this was preferential block voting). Block voting was also once used in South Australia. It was used for multi-member constituencies in parliamentary elections in the United Kingdom until their abolition, and remains in use throughout England and Wales for some local elections. It is also used in Jersey, Guernsey, the Isle of Man, the Cayman Islands (until 2013, FPTP since 2017), the Falkland Islands and Saint Helena.

Plurality block voting is or was also used in the election of the Senate of Poland (until 2011), of the Parliament of Lebanon, the plurality seats in the Palestinian Legislative Council and for the National Assembly of Mauritius. In some Lebanese and Palestinian constituencies, there is only one seat to be filled; in the Palestinian election of 1996 there were only plurality seats, but in 2006 half the seats were elected by plurality, half by proportional representation nationwide.

A form of plurality block voting was used for the elections of both houses of Parliament in Belgium before proportional representation was implemented in 1900. The system, however, was combined with a system similar to a runoff election; when not enough candidates had the majority of the votes in the first round, a second round was held between the highest ranked candidates of the first round (with two times as many candidates as seats to be filled). In some constituencies there was only one seat to be filled. A similar system to elect part of the Mongolian parliament. 48 Representatives are elected from districts with 1–3 members, the representatives are required to achieve at least 28% of the vote in a district to be elected, if there are unfilled seats after the first round of voting, a second round similar to the Belgian system is held to fill the remaining seat. The remaining representatives are elected separately using party list proportional representation on the national level.

In British Columbia, Canada, all local governments are elected using bloc voting for city councils and for other multi-member bodies (there called "at-large" voting). In other Canadian provinces, smaller cities are generally elected under plurality-at-large, while larger cities are generally elected under the "ward system" which is a municipal adaptation of single member plurality. The sole exception is London, Ontario which has recently changed to the Alternative Vote. When Toronto was amalgamated in 1997, the new entity's first election used a similar rule. From 1871 to 1988, British Columbia had some multi-member ridings using plurality-at-large, and others elected under single member plurality, with the number of each varying from one election to the next. Other Canadian provincial legislatures have in the past used plurality-at-large or single transferable vote, but now all members of provincial legislatures are exclusively elected under single-member plurality.

In Hong Kong, block voting is used for a tiny proportion of the territory's population to elect the members of the Election Committee, which is responsible for selecting the territory's Chief Executive.

Block voting was used in some constituencies for the House of Representatives of Japan in the first six general elections between 1890 and 1898: while the majority of seats was elected by plurality in 214 single-member districts, there were 43 two-member districts that elected their representatives by block voting.

The Philippines is the country with the most extensive experience in plurality-at-large voting. Positions where there are multiple winners usually use plurality-at-large voting, the exception is the election for sectoral representatives in the House of Representatives. The members of the Senate and all local legislatures are elected via this method. The members of the Interim Batasang Pambansa (the parliament) were also elected under this method in 1978.

Block voting is often used in corporate elections to elect the boards of directors of corporations including housing cooperatives, with each shareholder's vote being multiplied by the number of shares they own; however, cumulative voting is also popular.

See also 

 Voting bloc
 Multiple non-transferable vote
 Single non-transferable vote
 Block approval voting
 Municipal elections in France

Notes

References 

 http://www.mtholyoke.edu/offices/comm/oped/voter_rights.shtml
 Rogers v. Lodge, (1982) Supreme Court Case

External links 

 A Handbook of Electoral System Design from International IDEA
 Electoral Design Reference Materials from the ACE Project
 ACE Electoral Knowledge Network Expert site providing encyclopedia on Electoral Systems and Management, country by country data, a library of electoral materials, latest election news, the opportunity to submit questions to a network of electoral experts, and a forum to discuss all of the above
 TallyJ Election System A website tool customized to support Baha'i elections.

Electoral systems